Conus nanshaensis is a species of sea snail, a marine gastropod mollusc in the family Conidae, the cone snails, cone shells or cones.

This snail is predatory and venomous and is capable of "stinging" humans.

Description

Distribution
This marine species of cone snail occurs off the Spratly Islands, the South China Sea.

References

 Li F.-L. [Fenglan] & Lin M.-Y. [Minyu]. (2016). Fauna Sinica. Invertebrata 55. Mollusca: Gastropoda: Conidae. Beijing: Science Press. 286 pp., 4 pls. page(s): 73, fig. 43

External links
 

nanshaensis
Gastropods described in 2016